Events from the year 1860 in the United Kingdom.

Incumbents
 Monarch – Victoria
 Prime Minister – Henry John Temple, 3rd Viscount Palmerston (Liberal)
 Parliament – 18th

Events
 1 January – Cray Wanderers Football Club formed in St Mary Cray, north Kent.
 25 January – HMS Prince of Wales, a 121-gun screw-propelled first-rate ship of the line is launched at Portsmouth Dockyard.
 February – Royal Commission on the Defence of the United Kingdom recommends erection of the Palmerston Forts.
 27 February – paddle steamer Nimrod is wrecked off St David's Head in Wales and 45 people are killed.
 28 February – the Artists Rifles is established, as the 38th Middlesex (Artists) Rifle Volunteer Corps, with headquarters at Burlington House in London.
 March – Food and Drink Act, 1860 prohibits the adulteration of certain foodstuffs.
 7 March – HMS Howe, the Royal Navy's last, largest and fastest wooden first-rate three-decker ship of the line, is launched at Pembroke Dockyard but never completed for sea service.
 17 March – First Taranaki War between the Māori and British colonists in New Zealand begins.
 17 April – one of the last major bare-knuckle boxing matches in England, between Tom Sayers and the American John C. Heenan at Farnborough, Hampshire, ends in a draw as police break up the event.
 22 April – Eastbourne manslaughter.
 28 May – One of the worst storms ever experienced in the region hits the east coast of England, sinking more than 100 ships and killing at least 40 people.
 30 June – A historic debate about evolution is held, at the Oxford University Museum.
 9 July – the Nightingale Training School and Home for Nurses, the first nursing school based on the ideas of Florence Nightingale, is opened at St Thomas' Hospital in London.
 22 August – the British navy assists the troops of Giuseppe Garibaldi to cross from Sicily to the mainland of Italy.
 30 August – the first street trams in Britain are introduced in Birkenhead.
 October – John Hanning Speke and James Augustus Grant leave Zanzibar to search for source of the Nile.
 5 October – Austria, Britain, France, Prussia and the Ottoman Empire form a commission to investigate causes of the massacres of Maronite Christians, committed by Druzes in Lebanon earlier in the year.
 17 October – the first professional golf tournament is held at Prestwick in Scotland, sometimes regarded as the first Open, although it is not truly open until the following year.
 18 October – Second Opium War:
 Lord Elgin orders his forces to set fire to the huge complex of Beijing's Old Summer Palace, known as the Gardens of Perfect Brightness, which burns to the ground.
 The first Convention of Peking formally ends the War.
 November – the 'Temporary Home for Lost and Starving Dogs', predecessor of the Battersea Dogs and Cats Home, is established in London by Mary Tealby.
 1 December
 Charles Dickens publishes the first installment of Great Expectations in his magazine All the Year Round.
 The sixth underground explosion in the Risca Black Vein Pit at Crosskeys in the Sirhowy Valley of Monmouthshire kills 142 coal miners.
 26 December – The first Rules derby is held between Sheffield F.C. and Hallam F.C., the oldest football fixture in the world.
 29 December – the world's first ocean-going (all) iron-hulled and armoured battleship, HMS Warrior is launched on the Thames.
 unknown dates
Britain produces 20% of the entire world's output of industrial goods.
First recorded fish and chip shops in the UK, Joseph Malin's in London and John Lees' in Mossley near Oldham, Lancashire.

Publications
 Wilkie Collins' novel The Woman in White.
 Charles Dickens's novel Great Expectations (serialisation begins).
 George Eliot's novel The Mill on the Floss.
 Thomas Love Peacock's last novel Gryll Grange (serialisation).
 Robert Smith Surtees' comic novel Plain or Ringlets? (concludes publication).
 Anthony Trollope's novel Framley Parsonage (serialisation in the new Cornhill Magazine).
 The collection of broad-church essays on Christianity Essays and Reviews.
 The Western Morning News is first published (Plymouth, 3 January).

Births
 8 January – Emma Booth-Tucker, Salvationist (died 1903 in the United States)
 21 February – Goscombe John, Welsh sculptor (died 1952)
 25 February – William Ashley, economic historian (died 1927)
 6 March – Frederick George Jackson, Arctic explorer (died 1938)
 22 March – John George Bartholomew, Scottish cartographer (died 1920)
 9 April – Emily Hobhouse, humanitarian, feminist and pacifist (died 1926)
 2 May
 William Bayliss, physiologist (died 1924)
 John Scott Haldane, Scottish physiologist (died 1936)
 D'Arcy Wentworth Thompson, Scottish biologist (died 1948)
 7 May – Tom Norman, showman (died 1930)
 9 May –  J. M. Barrie, author (died 1937)
 30 May – Archibald Thorburn, wildlife painter (died 1935)
 6 June – William Inge, dean and theologian (died 1954)
 13 June – Lancelot Speed, illustrator (died 1931)
 25 June – Sutherland Macdonald, tattoo artist (died 1942)
 20 July – Margaret McMillan, American-born pioneer of nursery education (died 1931)
 22 July – Frederick Rolfe, writer and artist (died 1913)
 31 July – George Warrender, admiral (died 1917)
 3 August – W. K. Dickson, inventor (died 1935)
 5 August – Louis Wain, humorous artist (died 1939)
 7 August – Alan Leo, born William F. Allan, astrologer (died 1917)
 11 September – Ben Tillett, trade union leader (died 1943)
 22 November – Etta Lemon, born Smith, bird conservationist (died 1953)
 8 December – Amanda McKittrick Ros, born Anna McKittrick, Irish novelist and poet noted for her purple prose (died 1939)
 20 December –  Dan Leno, music hall comedian (died 1904)

Deaths
 1 January – Thomas Hobbes Scott, clergyman (born 1783)
 27 January – Sir Thomas Brisbane, astronomer (born 1773)
 9 February – William Evans Burton, dramatist, theatre manager and publisher (born 1804)
 17 March – Anna Brownell Jameson, cultural historian (born 1794)
 25 March – James Braid, surgeon (born 1795)
 4 May – William Ormsby-Gore, politician (born 1779)
 12 May – Sir Charles Barry, architect (born 1795)
 16 May – Anne Isabella Milbanke, wife of George Gordon Byron, 6th Baron Byron (born 1792)
 11 June – Baden Powell, mathematician and Church of England priest (born 1796)
 29 June – Thomas Addison, physician (born 1793)
 17 July – Betsi Cadwaladr, Crimea nurse (born 1789)
 2 August – Sir Henry Ward, diplomat, politician and colonial administrator (born 1797)
 3 August – Sir Henry Wyndham, British Army General and Conservative Party politician (born 1790)
 12 October – Sir Harry Smith, 1st Baronet, military commander (born 1787)
 31 October – Thomas Cochrane, 10th Earl of Dundonald, admiral (born 1775)
 11 December – Anne Knight, children's writer and educationist (born 1792)
 14 December – George Hamilton-Gordon, 4th Earl of Aberdeen, Prime Minister of the United Kingdom (born 1784)

See also
List of Acts of Parliament of the United Kingdom Parliament, 1860-1879
1860 in Scotland

References

 
Years of the 19th century in the United Kingdom